Lucifer Incestus is the fourth studio album by the Austrian blackened death metal band Belphegor.

Track listing

Personnel
 Belphegor
Helmuth Lehner - vocals, guitars
Sigurd Hagenauer - guitars
Bartholomäus "Barth" Resch - bass 
 
 Additional musicians
 Florian "Torturer" Klein - drums
 Mathias "der Hexer" Röderer - synthesizers

 Production 
 Tomasz "Graal" Daniłowicz - cover art
 Martin Schmidt, Mathias Röderer - engineer assistant
 Monsieur Joe Wimmer - photography
 Alexander Krull - Producer, recording, mixing, mastering
 Helmuth - Producer

 Note
 Recorded, engineered, mixed and mastered at Mastersound Studio-Germany, Fellbach in 2003.

Release history

References
 

Belphegor albums
2003 albums
Napalm Records albums
Albums produced by Alexander Krull
German-language albums